Raymond James Harrell (February 16, 1912 – January 28, 1984) was a pitcher in Major League Baseball. He played for the St. Louis Cardinals, Chicago Cubs, Philadelphia Phillies, Pittsburgh Pirates, and New York Giants.

References

External links

1912 births
1984 deaths
Major League Baseball pitchers
St. Louis Cardinals players
Chicago Cubs players
Philadelphia Phillies players
Pittsburgh Pirates players
New York Giants (NL) players
Baseball players from Texas
Minor league baseball managers
People from Clay County, Texas